Holly Mae Brood (born 25 November 1994) is a Dutch actress and presenter. She is best known for her role as Amy Kortenaer in the soap opera Goede tijden, slechte tijden and the spin-off series Nieuwe Tijden. She is also known as co-host of the Dutch/Flemish version of Love Island.

Career

Film and television 

She played a role in the 2016 films SneekWeek and Hart Beat. She played a role in the 2018 comedy film Mannen van Mars.

In 2019, she presented Holland's Next Make Over, a spin-off of Holland's Next Top Model. In that same year, she also appeared in the musical Lazarus at the DeLaMar theatre in Amsterdam, Netherlands.

In 2019 and 2020, she appeared in the television series Meisje van Plezier. She also played the role of Claudia in the 2020 film Life as It Should Be directed by Ruud Schuurman.

In March 2022, she appeared in an episode of the police drama series Flikken Maastricht.

, she is scheduled to appear in the 2023 film Alles is nog steeds zoals het zou moeten zijn which is the sequel to the 2020 film Life as It Should Be. , she is scheduled to appear in the Videoland series Hockeyvaders.

She appears in the 2022 film Foodies. She plays a lead role in the Netflix film The Takeover directed by Annemarie van de Mond. She also provided the voice for the character Goldilocks in the Dutch version of the film Puss in Boots: The Last Wish.

, she is scheduled to appear in the 2024 film De Break-Up Club. She is one of the team captains in the 2023 television show Alles is Muziek.

Television appearances 

In 2014, she finished in seventh place in the seventh season of Holland's Next Top Model.

In 2016, she appeared in an episode of the game show Ik hou van Holland. In 2017, she appeared in the second season of the Dutch singing television show It Takes 2. In that same year, she also appeared in the game show Een goed stel hersens. In 2019, she appeared in an episode of Groeten uit 19xx.

In 2021, she played the role of traitor in the television game show De Verraders. In February 2022, she sang a cover of the song Amor, amor, amor by Dutch singer André Hazes in the television show Hazes Is de Basis.

Personal life 

Her father, though not her biological father, is musician, painter, actor and poet Herman Brood. Her biological father Leo Spindelaar died in 2009. Fashion designer and artist Lola Pop Brood is her maternal half-sister.

She is in a relationship with Dutch musical actor Soy Kroon. They met in 2016 at an audition for the television series Nieuwe Tijden. In 2017, Brood and Kroon appeared in an episode of the game show De Jongens tegen de Meisjes. In 2018, they both won the fourth season the television show Dance Dance Dance.

Filmography

Film 

 SneekWeek (2016)
 Hart Beat (2016)
 Mannen van Mars (2018)
 Life as It Should Be (2020)
 Foodies (2022)
 The Takeover (2022)
 Alles is nog steeds zoals het zou moeten zijn (upcoming, 2023)
 De Break-Up Club (upcoming, 2024)

Television 

 Goede tijden, slechte tijden (2016 – 2017)
 Nieuwe Tijden (2016 – 2018)
 Meisje van Plezier (2019 – 2020)
 Flikken Maastricht (2022)

Videoland 

 Hockeyvaders (2023)

Voice acting 

 Puss in Boots: The Last Wish (Goldilocks, 2022)

As presenter 

 Love Island (2019 – 2022)

As team captain 

 Alles is Muziek (2023)

As contestant 

 Ik hou van Holland (2016)
 Een goed stel hersens (2017)
 It Takes 2 (2017)
 De Jongens tegen de Meisjes (2017)
 Dance Dance Dance (2018)
 De Verraders (2021)

As herself 

 Unknown Brood (2016)
 Groeten uit 19xx (2019)

References

External links 

 

Living people
1994 births
Actresses from Amsterdam
Dutch actresses
Dutch film actresses
Dutch television actresses
Dutch soap opera actresses
Dutch women television presenters
21st-century Dutch actresses